is a retired Japanese professional baseball outfielder. He played for the Chunichi Dragons of the Nippon Professional Baseball(NPB).

Professional career

In the 2015 off-season he along with team mates Iori Katsura, Shuhei Takahashi, Tomohiro Hamada and Junki Kishimoto were loaned to the Taiwanese winter league 

Along with teammates Shun Ishikawa and Takuya Kinoshita, Tomonaga was selected for the Western League representative team for the 2016 Fresh All-Stars game in Okayama. Tomonaga started in centre-field, batting 3rd in the line-up and recorded 1 hit in 4 at-bats.

On December 2, 2019, he become free agent.

Career statistics

Bold indicates league leader; statistics current as of 29 September 2016

References

External links

NPB.jp

1991 births
Living people
Chunichi Dragons players
Japanese baseball players
People from Hadano, Kanagawa
Baseball people from Kanagawa Prefecture